Tamás Cseri (born 15 January 1988) is a Hungarian professional footballer who plays as a midfielder for Mezőkövesdi SE.

Club career
On 15 July 2017, Cseri signed for Nemzeti Bajnokság I club Mezőkövesdi SE.

International career
Cseri made his Hungary national team debut on 6 September 2020 at the age of 32 in a Nations League game against Russia. He substituted Dominik Szoboszlai in the 82nd minute of a 3–2 home loss.

On 1 June 2021, Cseri was included in the final 26-man squad to represent Hungary at the rescheduled UEFA Euro 2020 tournament.

Career statistics

Honours

Mezőkövesd
Hungarian Cup runner-up: 2019-20

References

External links

1998 births
Living people
Sportspeople from Győr
Hungarian footballers
Hungary international footballers
Association football midfielders
Mosonmagyaróvári TE 1904 footballers
Győri ETO FC players
Pécsi MFC players
BKV Előre SC footballers
Gyirmót FC Győr players
Kisvárda FC players
Mezőkövesdi SE footballers
Nemzeti Bajnokság I players
UEFA Euro 2020 players
21st-century Hungarian people